The Roman Catholic Metropolitan Archdiocese of Seoul (Latin: Archidioecesis Metropolitae Seulensis) is a Metropolitan archdiocese of the Latin Church of the Roman Catholic Church comprising the metropolitan area of Seoul, South Korea, whose province comprises parts of South Korea (which has two more provinces) and all North Korea, yet depends on the missionary Roman Congregation for the Evangelization of Peoples.
 
Its Metropolitan bishop as the Archbishop of Seoul resides at his Myeongdong Cathedral in Jung-gu, Seoul. The Archbishop of Seoul is also the Apostolic Administrator of the Diocese of Pyongyang in North Korea.

There are 57 Catholic secretly active parishes in North Korea, but due to the current regime in place, no Catholic priests are permitted permanent residency at the present time.

Statistics 
, it pastorally served 1,534,887 Catholics (15.7% of 9,765,869 total) on 17,349 km2 in 232 parishes with 954 priests.

List of territorial losses 
Pope Leo XIII was the first to approve to separate the community from the control of diocese of Beijing and assigned priests from the Paris Foreign Missions Society but never went due to the Anti-Christian sentiment and persecutions during that time.

 Pope Gregory XVI granted a Papal bull declaring it as an official See  on 9 September 1831, referring to it as the Apostolic Vicariate of Korea  조선 / Corea (Curiate Italian) / 朝鮮 (正體中文), on territory split off from the then Diocese of Peking, of what used to be part of Imperial China.
 It was renamed on 8 April 1911 as Apostolic Vicariate of Seoul 서울 / 漢城 (正體中文), when it also lost territory to establish the Apostolic Vicariate of Taiku (Daegu).
 It lost more territories, beginning on 8 May 1920 to establish the Apostolic Vicariate of Wonsan
 On  17 March 1927, it lost again to establish the Apostolic Prefecture of Hpyeng-yang 
 On 25 April 1939, it lost again to establish the Apostolic Prefecture of Shunsen.
 It was again officially renamed on 12 July 1950 after its See as Apostolic Vicariate of Seul.
 It lost territories again on 23 June 1958 to establish the Apostolic Vicariate of Cheongju and the Apostolic Vicariate of Daijeon, 
 On 6 June 1961, it lost again to make the Apostolic Vicariate of Incheon, all three now have Suffragan bishops.
 The diocese was raised to the level of Metropolitan Archdiocese on 10 March 1962.
 It lost again on 7 October 1963 to establish the Roman Catholic Diocese of Suwon 
 It lost again on 24 June  2004  to establish the Roman Catholic Diocese of Uijeongbu, now both its suffragans.

The diocese has received two official Papal visits from Pope John Paul II in May 1984 and October 1989 and from Pope Francis in August 2014.

Ecclesiastical province 
The Metropolitan's ecclesiastical province comprises his own Archdiocese and the following suffragan bishoprics, mostly in South Korea :
 Roman Catholic Diocese of Chuncheon 춘천
 Roman Catholic Diocese of Daejeon 대전
 Roman Catholic Diocese of Hamhung 함흥 (in North Korea)
 Roman Catholic Diocese of Incheon 인천
 Roman Catholic Diocese of Pyongyang 평양 (in North Korea)
 Roman Catholic Diocese of Suwon 수원
 Roman Catholic Diocese of Uijeongbu 의정부
 Roman Catholic Diocese of Wonju 원주

Leadership

Ordinaries

Apostolic Vicars of Korea
 Barthélemy Bruguière, M.E.P. (1831–1835)
 Saint Laurent-Joseph-Marius Imbert, M.E.P. (1836–1839)
 Jean-Joseph-Jean-Baptiste Ferréol, M.E.P. (1843–1853)
 Saint Siméon-François Berneux, M.E.P. (1854–1866)
 Saint Antoine-Marie-Nicolas Daveluy, M.E.P. (1866)
 Félix-Clair Ridel, M.E.P. (1869–1884)
 Marie-Jean-Gustave Blanc, M.E.P. (1884–1890)
 Gustave-Charles-Marie Mutel, M.E.P. (1890–1911)

Apostolic Vicars of Seoul
 Gustave-Charles-Marie Mutel, M.E.P. (1911–1933), appointed Archbishop (personal title) in 1926
 Adrien-Joseph Larribeau, M.E.P. (1933–1942), appointed Apostolic Vicar and later Bishop of Daijeon
 Paul Roh Ki-nam (1942–1962)

Archbishops of Seoul
 Paul Roh Ki-nam (1962–1967)
Victorinus Youn Kong-hi (1967–1968; apostolic administrator)
 Cardinal Stephen Kim Sou-hwan (1968–1998)
 Cardinal Nicholas Cheong Jin-suk (1998–2012)
 Cardinal Andrew Yeom Soo-jung (2012–2021)
 Peter Chung Soon-taick, O.C.D. (2021–present)

Coadjutor Bishops
 Jean-Joseph-Jean-Baptiste Ferréol, M.E.P. (1838–1843)
 Saint Siméon-François Berneux, M.E.P. (1844–1854)
 Saint Antoine-Marie-Nicolas Daveluy, M.E.P. (1855–1866)
 Marie-Jean-Gustave Blanc, M.E.P. (1877–1884)
 Émile-Alexandre-Joseph Devred, M.E.P. (1920–1926), never succeeded to see
 Adrien-Joseph Larribeau, M.E.P. (1926–1933)

Auxiliary Bishops
Joseph Kyeong Kap-ryong (1977–1984), appointed Bishop of Daejeon
 Paul Kim Ok-kyun (1985–2001)
 Peter Kang U-il (1985–2002), appointed Bishop of Cheju
Andreas Choi Chang-mou (1994–1999), appointed Coadjutor Archbishop and later Archbishop of Gwangju
Joseph Lee Han-taek (2001–2004), appointed Bishop of Uijeongbu
Andrew Yeom Soo-jung (2001–2012), appointed Archbishop of Seoul
Lucas Kim Woon-hoe (2002–2010), appointed Bishop of Chunchon
 Basil Cho Kyu-man (2006–2016), appointed Bishop of Wonju
 Peter Chung Soon-taick, O.C.D. (2014–2021), appointed Archbishop of Seoul
 Timothy Yu Gyoung-chon (2014–present)
 Benedictus Son Hee-song (2015–present)
 Job Koo Yobi (2017–present)

See also 
 List of Catholic Dioceses in Korea

References

Sources and external links 
  Official homepage
 GCatholic.org, with Google map – data for all sections

 
Roman Catholic dioceses in South Korea
Religious organizations established in 1931
Roman Catholic dioceses and prelatures established in the 20th century
Religion in Seoul
A